NMG is the callsign of the National Hurricane Center's Atlantic basin radiofax radio station.  It broadcasts from the United States Coast Guard station in New Orleans, Louisiana with 4 kilowatts of power.

TAFB weather forecasts are transmitted full-time on the following frequencies:
4317.9 kHz
8503.9 kHz
12789.9 kHz.

NMG also broadcasts at 17146.4 kHz between 1200 and 2045 UTC.

External links
NHC Marine Radiofax Broadcast Schedule
NATIONAL WEATHER SERVICE MARINE PRODUCTS VIA U.S. COAST GUARD HF VOICE

National Weather Service
Radio stations in Louisiana
Tropical cyclone meteorology